The following are protected federal lands in the state of Utah:


National Parks

There are five National Parks within the state of Utah:
Zion National Park near Springdale
Bryce Canyon National Park near Tropic
Capitol Reef National Park and near Torrey
Arches National Park near Moab
Canyonlands National Park near Moab

National Monuments
The eight National Monuments in the state of Utah are:
Bears Ears National Monument near San Juan County
Cedar Breaks National Monument near Cedar City
Dinosaur National Monument near Vernal
Grand Staircase–Escalante National Monument near Kanab
Hovenweep National Monument near Bluff
Natural Bridges National Monument near Mexican Hat
Rainbow Bridge National Monument near Page, Arizona
Timpanogos Cave National Monument near Highland

National Recreation Areas

The two National Recreation Areas within the state of Utah are:
Glen Canyon National Recreation Area, located in Kane County, San Juan County, Garfield County
Flaming Gorge National Recreation Area, located in Daggett County

National Historical Parks
The one National Historical Park within the state of Utah is:
Golden Spike National Historical Park near Corinne

National Historic Trails
There are 583 miles of National Historic Trails in Utah, which include the following trails:
California National Historic Trail through northern Utah
Old Spanish National Historic Trail through central and southern Utah
Pony Express National Historic Trail through northern Utah

National Forests

The 7 National Forests within the state of Utah are:
Ashley National Forest
Dixie National Forest
Fishlake National Forest
Manti La Sal National Forest
Sawtooth National Forest
Uinta-Wasatch Cache National Forest
Caribou–Targhee National Forest

National Wilderness Areas

The 31 National Wilderness Areas within the state of Utah are:
Ashdown Gorge Wilderness
Beartrap Canyon Wilderness
Beaver Dam Mountains Wilderness
Black Ridge Canyons Wilderness
Box-Death Hollow Wilderness
Canaan Mountain Wilderness
Cedar Mountain Wilderness
Cottonwood Forest Wilderness
Cougar Canyon Wilderness
Dark Canyon Wilderness
Deep Creek Wilderness
Deseret Peak Wilderness
Doc's Pass Wilderness
Goose Creek Wilderness
High Uintas Wilderness
LaVerkin Creek Wilderness
Lone Peak Wilderness
Mount Naomi Wilderness
Mount Nebo Wilderness
Mount Olympus Wilderness
Mount Timpanogos Wilderness
Paria Canyon-Vermilion Cliffs Wilderness
Pine Valley Mountain Wilderness
Red Butte Wilderness
Red Mountain Wilderness
Slaughter Creek Wilderness
Taylor Creek Wilderness
Twin Peaks Wilderness
Wellsville Mountains Wilderness
Zion Wilderness

National Conservation Areas
The two National Conservation Areas within the state of Utah are:
Red Cliffs National Conservation Area
Beaver Dam Wash National Conservation Area

National Wildlife Refuges
The three National Wildlife Refuges within the state of Utah are:
Bear River Migratory Bird Wildlife Refuge
Fish Springs National Wildlife Refuge 
Ouray National Wildlife Refuge

National Recreation Trails

The 18 federally designated National Recreation Trails in the state of Utah are:
Bald Mountain National Recreation Trail
Bicentennial National Recreation Trail
Cascade Falls National Recreation Trail v
Cascade Springs National Recreation Trail 
Fish Creek National Recreation Trail
Fish Creek National Recreation Trail (there are two called Fish Creek)
Fisher Towers National Recreation Trail
Gooseberry Mesa National Recreation Trail
Historic Union Pacific Rail National Recreation Trail 
Lakeshore National Recreation Trail
Left Fork Huntington Creek National Recreation Trail
Little Hole National Recreation Trail
Moab Slickrock Bike National Recreation Trail
Mount Timpanogos National Recreation Trail
Naomi Peak National Recreation Trail
Skyline National Recreation Trail
Wetland Wonders Walk National Recreation Trail 
Whipple National Recreation Trail

National Scenic Byways
The 8 federally designated National Scenic Byways in the state of Utah are:
Brian Head-Panguitch Lake National Scenic Byway
Dinosaur Diamond Prehistoric Highway National Scenic Byway 
Energy Loop: Huntington & Eccles Canyons National Scenic Byway
Flaming Gorge-Uintas National Scenic Byway  
Highway 12 All American Road National Scenic Byway 
Logan Canyon National Scenic Byway 
Nebo Loop National Scenic Byway 
Trail of the Ancients National Scenic Byway

Gallery

See also

 List of Utah Scenic Byways
 List of Utah State Parks
State of Utah
Utah Transfer of Public Lands Act

References

Protected areas of Utah
Utah geography-related lists